Public journalism may mean:

 Citizen journalism, journalism as practiced by non-professionals
 Civic journalism, a brand of politically engaged journalism practiced by certain news organizations